Institute of Technology and Management, Raipur (ITM University) is a private university located in Raipur, Chhattisgarh established under Section 9 (2) of the Chhattisgarh Private Universities (Establishment and Operations Amendment) Act 2011 by the private organization ITM Society Raipur.

Infrastructure

The ITM campus is spread over 2.3 acres of land with two buildings which hosts Vice Chancellor (VC) chambers, 20 classrooms, 12 laboratories, two computer labs, library, and an open sports ground.

Programs

School of Engineering & Research
 Bachelor of Technology (B.Tech)
 Master of Technology (M. Tech)
 Doctor of Philosophy (Ph.D)

School of Commerce Management & Research
 Bachelor of Business Administration (BBA)
 Master of Business Administration (MBA)
Bachelor of Commerce honours (B.com.)
Master of commerce(M.com)
 Doctor of Philosophy (Ph.D)

School of Law
 BBA - LLB (Bachelor of Business Administration with Bachelor of Law)

School of Life and Allied Sciences
 B.Optometry
 B.Sc Medical Lab Technology
 B.Sc (Bio-Chemistry/Microbiology)
 M.Sc. Biochemistry
 M.Sc Microbiology
 Doctor of Philosophy (Ph.D)
 Industrial partners of Life & Allied Sciences

School of Information Technology
 PGDCA

References

External links
 

Private universities in India
Universities in Chhattisgarh
Education in Raipur, Chhattisgarh
Educational institutions established in 2012
2012 establishments in Chhattisgarh